Suh Kyung-bae (born January 14, 1963) is a South Korean billionaire businessman. He is the chairman and CEO of Amorepacific Corporation, a Korean cosmetics company founded by his father Suh Sung-whan in 1945.

Early life
Suh Kyung-bae was born in South Korea in 1963. He received a bachelor's degree in business administration from Yonsei University and an MBA from Samuel Curtis Johnson Graduate School of Management at Cornell University.

Career
In 1997, Suh inherited the company from his father and guided the company's global expansion. According to Forbes, Amorepacific became one of the world's 100 most innovative companies.

In 2006, Suh received the Légion d'honneur from the French government. In 2015, he was selected as "Businessman of the Year" by Forbes Asia Magazine and in 2017, was ranked world's 20th, Asia's 2nd best-performing CEO by Harvard Business Review and INSEAD Business School.

Suh is married, with two children, and lives in Seoul.

Non-profit work 
In 2016, Suh established Suh Kyung-bae Science Foundation. Since 2017, the foundation has awarded 14 scientists grants of between 1.5 billion and 2.5 billion won.

References 

1963 births
Living people
Amorepacific Corporation
Yonsei University alumni
South Korean businesspeople
South Korean billionaires
Cornell University alumni
Icheon Seo clan